Anosy Avaratra is a rural municipality in Analamanga Region, in the Central Highlands of Madagascar. It belongs to the district of Antananarivo Avaradrano and its population numbers to 15,243 in 2019.

It is a relatively new municipality that was split off from Sabotsy Namehana only in October 2015.
It is located in the North of Antananarivo along the National Road 3. Five Fokontany (villages) make up the territory of this municipality: Anosy Avaratra, Ambohitrinimanga, Isahafa, Lazaina and Faravohitra.

Economy
The economy is based on substantial agriculture. Rice, corn, peanuts, beans, manioc are the main crops.

References

External links
Monographie de la Commune

Populated places in Analamanga